Christian Haring (* 18 December 1970, Schattendorf) is an Austrian Dancer and Choreographer. He is founder and artistic director of the dance compagnie Liquid Loft.

Life 
Chris Haring studied at Universität für Musik und darstellende Kunst in Vienna and in New York, within others at Cunningham School. He worked as a dancer with compagnies like Nikolais/Luis Dance Cie. (US), man act (GB), Nigel Charnock (GB), DV8 Physical Theatre (GB), Cie. Willi Dorner (AT) and Pilottanzt (AT). For his own choreografies we worked with fine artists such as Erwin Wurm, Michel Blazy and Aldo Giannotti, musician Peter Rehberg or media artist Klaus Obermaier. Together with filmmaker Mara Mattuschka. he co-directed movies based on his performances.

Together with the musician Andreas Berger, dancer Stephanie Cumming and dramaturg Thomas J. Jelinek he founded the dance compagnie Liquid Loft in 2005.

Choreographies 
 D.A.V.E., 1999 (with Klaus Obermaier)
 Vivisector, 2002 (with Klaus Obermaier)
 Fremdkoerper, 2003
 Diese Körper, Diese Spielverderber, 2004
 Legal Errorist, 2004
 My Private Bodyshop, 2005
 Kind of Heroes, 2005
 Running Sushi, 2006
 Posing Project A – The Art of Wow, 2007
 Posing Project B – The Art of Seduction, 2007
 The China Project & Lovely Liquid Lounge, 2009 (with Jin Xing Dance Theatre)
 Sacre – The Rite Thing, 2010 (with Les Ballets de Monte-Carlo)
 Talking Head, 2010
 WELLNESS (The Perfect Garden), 2011
 Mush:Room (The Perfect Garden), 2012
 Groza, 2012 (with Dialogue Dance, Kostroma)
 Mush : Room (extended), 2012
 Grace Note, 2012 (with Phace Ensemble in the frame of Wien Modern)
 Deep Dish (The Perfect Garden), 2012
 LEGO LOVE, 2013 (with Staatstheater Kassel)
 Frozen Laugh, 2014 (with Ballett Moskau)
 Shiny, shiny… (Imploding Portraits Inevitable), 2014
 False Colored Eyes (Imploding Portraits Inevitable), 2015 (Burgtheater Wien, Impulstanz Vienna International Dance Festival)
 Candy's Camouflage, 2016

Film 
Co-Regie with Mara Mattuschka
 Legal Errorist, 2005 (Permanent exhibition at Centre Georges-Pompidou, Paris)
 Part Time Heroes, 2007
 Running Sushi, 2008
 Burning Palace, 2009
 Perfect Garden, 2014

Awards 
 2004 Award for best performance at the Biennale de la Dance Lyon, with "Fremdkoerper”
 2007 Goldener Löwe at the Biennale in Venedig for "Best Performance" with Posing Project B – The Art of Seduction (with Liquid Loft)
 2008 NORMAN, Wand 5, Stuttgarter Filmwinter for "Part Time Heroes", (with Mara Mattuschka / Liquid Loft)
 2008 Best innovative Experimental-, Animation and short movie at Diagonale – Festival of Austrian Film with "Running Sushi" (with Mara Mattuschka / Liquid Loft)
 2009 Diaphone Award, Cindeans, Amsterdam, für "Burning Palace", (with Mara Mattuschka / Liquid Loft)
 2009 Audience Award, Wand 5, Stuttgart for "Running Sushi", (with Mara Mattuschka / Liquid Loft)
 2009 Award Kurzfilmtage Oberhausen, for "Burning Palace", (with Mara Mattuschka / Liquid Loft)
 2010 outstanding artist award – Darstellende Kunst, Bundesministerium für Unterricht, Kunst und Kultur for Chris Haring.

Literature 
 Andrea Amort, Mimi Wunderer-Gosch (Hrsg.): Österreich tanzt. Geschichte und Gegenwart. Böhlau-Verlag, Wien 2001, .
 Kim Knowles: Film, Performance, and the Spaces Between: The Collaborative Works of Mara Mattuschka and Chris Haring (forthcoming)

External links 
 liquidloft.at
 Interview mit Chris Haring
 Der Standard
 FAQ Magazine

References 

Living people
Contemporary dance choreographers
Contemporary dancers
Year of birth missing (living people)